MediaCorp Channel 8's television series Life Is Beautiful is a medical drama serial produced by MediaCorp Singapore in 2014. The drama is a collaboration between MediaCorp and the National Kidney Foundation (NKF), which hopes to raise awareness of kidney-related diseases.

It is currently airing on MediaCorp Channel 8 in Singapore from 5 March 2015 and will run until April 2015.

Episodic Guide

See also
List of programmes broadcast by Mediacorp Channel 8
Life Is Beautiful
National Kidney Foundation Singapore

References

Lists of Singaporean television series episodes